Warrayu is a small Aboriginal community, located proximate to Wyndham in the Kimberley region of Western Australia, within the Shire of Wyndham-East Kimberley.

Background 
The Warrayu community was established in the early seventies and maintains cultural and genealogical connections with Forrest River Mission community, otherwise known as Oombulgurri. The older residents of Warrayu community are originally from ancestral grounds near Oombulgurri.

Native title 
The community is covered by the registered Balangarra 3 native title claim (WC00/6).

Governance 
The community is managed by the Warrayu Aboriginal Corporation, incorporated under the Commonwealth's Incorporations and Associations Act.

Town planning 
Warrayu Layout Plan No.1 has been prepared in accordance with State Planning Policy 3.2 Aboriginal Settlements, and was endorsed by the community on 23 January 2003 and the Western Australian Planning Commission on 15 April 2003. The Layout Plan map-set and background report can be viewed at Planning Western Australia's website.

References 

Aboriginal communities in Kimberley (Western Australia)